Neuhausen Rheinfall is a railway station in Neuhausen am Rheinfall, in the Swiss canton of Schaffhausen. The station opened on 13 December 2015, principally to serve the tourist attraction of the Rhine Falls, from which it takes its name. It is linked by a combination of bridges and elevators to the bank of the River Rhine, just below the waterfall.

Location
The station is located on the Eglisau to Neuhausen line of the Swiss Federal Railways (SBB) that crosses the international border twice on its route between the Swiss cantons of Zürich and Schaffhausen. The station is operated by the SBB and is an intermediate stop on the Zürich S-Bahn line S9 between Zürich and Schaffhausen, and the Schaffhausen S-Bahn between Jestetten and Schaffhausen. Both lines operate hourly for most of the day, combining to provide a half-hourly service to and from Schaffhausen.

Neuhausen Rheinfall station is one of three stations in Neuhausen am Rheinfall, the other two being , which is the next station in the direction of Schaffhausen on the same line, and Neuhausen Badischer Bahnhof, which is on a different line (High Rhine Railway line).

Neuhausen Rheinfall station is also one of two stations intended to serve the Rhine Falls, the other being  on the opposite bank of the river (next to the Laufen Castle).

Train services
The railway station is served exclusively by regional trains (S-Bahn). Services calling at the station are Zurich S-Bahn line S9 and an unnumbered line of Schaffhausen S-Bahn (operated by THURBO):

Bus services

The closest bus stop is Neuhausen Zentrum just above the railway station in the center of Neuhausen am Rheinfall. This bus stop is served by municipal bus lines 1 (trolleybus) and 7, both operated by Verkehrsbetriebe Schaffhausen (vbsh).

Customs
Customs checks may be performed aboard trains and at Neuhausen Rheinfall station by Swiss officials. Systematic passport controls were abolished when Switzerland joined the Schengen Area in 2008.

References

External links 
 

Railway stations in the canton of Schaffhausen
Swiss Federal Railways stations
Neuhausen am Rheinfall
Railway stations in Switzerland opened in 2015